Kristjan Prendi (born 13 October 1997) is an Albanian professional footballer who plays as a forward for Albanian club Dinamo Tirane and the Albania national under-21 team.

Club career

Early career
Prendi started his youth career with KF Tirana at age of 12. He scored 1 goal on 11 February 2016 in the Albanian youth cup against Partizani Tirana U19.

In April 2016 Prendi was promoted to the senior team at KF Tirana by coach Ilir Daja.

International career
Prendi received his first international call up at the Albania national under-21 football team by coach Alban Bushi for a gathering between 14–17 May 2017 with most of the players selected from Albanian championships.

Honours

Club

Tirana
 Albanian Supercup: 2017

References

External links
Kristjan Prendi profile FSHF.org

1997 births
Living people
Footballers from Tirana
Albanian footballers
Association football forwards
Albania youth international footballers
Albania under-21 international footballers
KF Tirana players
KF Bylis Ballsh players
KF Korabi Peshkopi players
FK Dinamo Tirana players
Kategoria Superiore players
Kategoria e Parë players